Breon Thomas Corcoran (born July 1971) is an Irish businessman, and the CEO of WorldRemit and a non-executive director of Tilney Investment Management Services and Bestinvest, both part of the Tilney Group. He was CEO of Paddy Power Betfair from February 2016 to January 2018.

Early life
Breon Thomas Corcoran was born in July 1971, in Mullingar, Ireland in 1971. He has a degree in Mathematics from Trinity College Dublin and an MBA from INSEAD.

Career
He worked for JP Morgan and Bankers Trust, before joining bookmakers Paddy Power in April 2001 with responsibility for developing the non-retail business, becoming a board director in 2004, and rising to COO in August 2010. He joined Betfair as CEO in August 2012.

In June 2015, Corcoran was appointed as a non-executive director of Tilney Group.

In 2016, he sold part of his share package in Betfair for an estimated £4.1 million.

In August 2017, Corcoran announced he was stepping down as CEO of Paddy Power Betfair, he was succeeded in January 2018 by Peter Jackson.

In October 2018, Corcoran joined WorldRemit as their CEO.

On 8 February 2021, British digital auction platform Auction Technology Group (ATG), chaired by Corcoran, announced plans to float in the London Stock Exchange in March 2021. The listing is expected to value ATG at £600 million, and the firm said it is hoping to raise £250 million through the IPO.

Personal life
Corcoran is married with three children and lives in Barnes, London.

References

Living people
1971 births
People from Mullingar
Alumni of Trinity College Dublin
INSEAD alumni
Irish chief executives